A glycinergic agent (or drug) is a chemical which functions to directly modulate the glycine system in the body or brain. Examples include glycine receptor agonists, glycine receptor antagonists, and glycine reuptake inhibitors.

See also
 Adenosinergic
 Adrenergic
 Cannabinoidergic
 Cholinergic
 Dopaminergic
 GABAergic
 Histaminergic
 Melatonergic
 Monoaminergic
 Opioidergic
 Serotonergic

References

Neurochemistry
Neurotransmitters